Business economics is a field in applied economics which uses economic theory and quantitative methods to analyze business enterprises and the factors contributing to the diversity of organizational structures and the relationships of firms with labour, capital and product markets. A professional focus of the journal Business Economics has been expressed as providing "practical information for people who apply economics in their jobs."

Business economics is an integral part of traditional economics and is an extension of economic concepts to the real business situations. It is an applied science in the sense of a tool of managerial decision-making and forward planning by management. In other words, business economics is concerned with the application of economic theory to business management. Business economics is based on microeconomics in two categories: positive and negative.

Business economics focuses on the economic issues and problems related to business organization, management, and strategy. Issues and problems include: an explanation of why corporate firms emerge and exist; why they expand: horizontally, vertically and spacially; the role of entrepreneurs and entrepreneurship; the significance of organizational structure; the relationship of firms with employees, providers of capital,  customers, and government; and interactions between firms and the business environment.

Ambiguity in the use of term
The term 'business economics' is used in a variety of ways.  Sometimes it is used as synonymously with industrial economics/industrial organisation, managerial economics, and economics for business. Still, there may be substantial differences in the usage of 'economics for business' and 'managerial economics' with the latter used more narrowly.
One view of the distinctions between these would be that business economics is wider in its scope than industrial economics in that it would be concerned not only with "industry" but also businesses in the service sector. Economics for business looks at the major principles of economics but focuses on applying these economic principles to the real world of business. Managerial economics is the application of economic methods in the managerial decision-making process.

Business economics is actually the part of economics which can be simply regarded as the combination of economic theories and the relevant theories related to business management. Business economics is the study to focus on how economic theories will be affected the performance of business or business activities in practice. There are many practical case studies that have used the economic theories into the corporate development. For example, the product life cycle theory has discussed the entire product life cycle based on the economic perspective, which can be categorized by introduction, growth, maturity and decline. Apple Inc. is a multinational technological company that focuses on the electronic products’ designs and development as well as software development. IPhone is the company’s one of the competitive advantages that generate massive profit for the company. However, since smartphone product has moved to stages between maturity and decline, Apple Inc. has also considered the new product research development such as electric vehicles as the competitive environment in smartphone market becomes fierce and profit margin has declined. The example has well explained the scenario where economic theories do help to support the decision-making in the practical business organisation.  

However, Andrei alludes to the fact that although economic theories could provide the theoretical perception to explain the business context, it could be still hard for managers to make an accurate business decision in the organisational management as the economic theories are built on some certain assumptions in the modelling environment, but in the practical business environment is much complex and hard to predict. The economic theory consideration does not mean the business decision will be always accurate. Hence, in the practical business environment, managers should not only consider the application of economic theories but also concern internal and external factors in the organisations before the decision making.

Interpretations from various universities 
Many universities offer courses in business economics and offer a range of interpretations as to the meaning of the word. The Bachelor of Business Economics (BBE) Program at University of Delhi is designed to meet the growing need for an analytical and quantitative approach to problem solving in the changing corporate world by the application of the latest techniques evolved in the fields of economics and business. The Autonomous University of Barcelona (UAB), the Universidad Pública de Navarra (UPNa) and the University of the Balearic Islands (UIB) developed an official Master of Science in Management, Organization and Business Economics focused on management and business topics to train professionals in the study of organizations, on a conceptual and quantitative basis. To achieve this, advanced analysis tools are used from the fields of Neoclassical economics, New institutional economics, Statistics, Econometrics and Operations research. This focus is complemented with contributing ideas and theories to develop the necessary instruments to facilitate the management of sophisticated and complex organizations.

The program at Harvard University uses economic methods to analyze practical aspects of business, including business administration, management, and related fields of business economics.  The Universidad del Desarrollo, in Chile follows on Harvard University definition, adding entrepreurnship as a field of business. The University of Miami defines business economics as involving the study of how we use our resources for the production, distribution, and consumption of goods and services.  This requires business economists to analyze social institutions, banks, the stock market, the government and their relationships with labor negotiations, taxes, international trade, and urban and environmental issues.

Courses at the University of Manchester interpret business economics to be concerned with the economic analysis of how businesses contribute to welfare of society rather than on the welfare of an individual or a business. This is done via an examination of the relationship between ownership, control and firm objectives; theories of the growth of the firm; the behavioural theory of the firm; theories of entrepreneurship; the factors that influence the structure, conduct and performance of business at the industry level.

Italian universities borrow their concept of business economics from the tradition of Gino Zappa, for example a standard course  at the Politecnico di Milano involves studying corporate governance, accounting, investment analysis, budgeting and business strategy.

La Trobe University of Melbourne, Australia associates business economics with the process of demand, supply and equilibrium coordinating the behaviour of individuals and businesses in the market. Also, business economics extends to government policy, economic variables and international factors which influence business and competition.

See also 

 Hawley's risk theory of profit (1893)
 Industrial organisation
 Business studies

Note

External links 
 National Association for Business Economics (NABE, United States): Homepage 
 Canadian Association for Business Economics (CABE)
 Australian Business Economists

 
Business education
Management theory